Omega Sentinel can refer to:

A Marvel Comics character more commonly called Karima Shapandar. 
A Transformers character or series of characters related to incarnations of Omega Supreme.